Kavirat Rural District is a rural district (dehestan) in Chatrud District, Kerman County, Kerman Province, Iran. At the 2006 census, its population was 8,737, in 1,988 families. The rural district has 53 villages.

References 

Rural Districts of Kerman Province
Kerman County